Leaving Certificate mathematics is the second and final phase of mathematics education at secondary level in Ireland. Following on the Junior Certificate mathematics curriculum, it is designed as a two-year course of study at one of three levels: foundation, ordinary, or higher. It culminates with two 150-minute papers during the Leaving Certificate examinations.

A required subject for matriculation at almost all Irish third-level institutions, Leaving Certificate mathematics has been dogged with controversy in recent years due to dwindling enrolment in the higher-level course and poor academic performance in the subject overall. In 2007, more than 40 percent of Leaving Certificate mathematics candidates received 20 or fewer CAO points in the subject, out of a possible 100, with only 12 percent earning 65 points or more.

Levels and syllabi
Leaving Certificate mathematics may be taken at foundation, ordinary, or higher level, with each level following a separate syllabus. The current syllabi for all three levels were introduced on a phased basis between 2010 and 2015 under Project Maths, a series of curriculum reforms aimed at improving students' problem-solving skills. A pilot group consisting of 24 schools across Ireland sat the first phase of Project Maths examinations in June 2010 and June 2011, while all other schools sat their first Project Maths examinations in 2012. The syllabi were gradually revised each year until a finalised syllabus was published for the 2015 examination year.

Foundation-level mathematics was introduced to the curriculum in September 1991 and first examined in June 1992. Intended for students who would otherwise struggle at ordinary level, the foundation-level course fulfills matriculation requirements at most third-level institutions. However, it does not carry any CAO points and generally does not qualify candidates for third-level courses that have mathematics prerequisites. Government ministers have urged greater acceptance of foundation-level mathematics at third level.

Exam participation and results, 2005–08
 In 2005, 52,176 candidates sat the Leaving Certificate mathematics exam, of whom 5,563 (10.6 percent) took the foundation-level papers, 36,772 (70.5 percent) took the ordinary-level papers, and 9,841 (18.9 percent) took the higher-level papers. Among those taking the higher-level papers, 15.7 percent earned an A-grade and 78.3 percent received a C-grade or higher, while 17.6 percent received a D-grade and 4.1 percent failed. Among ordinary-level candidates, 13.3 percent received an A-grade, and 66.6 percent received a C-grade or higher, but 21.5 percent received a D-grade and 11.9 percent failed. At foundation level, 7.5 percent of candidates received an A-grade and 72 percent received a C-grade or higher. Twenty percent received a D-grade and 7.7 percent failed.
 In 2006, 49,235 candidates sat the exam, of whom 5,104 (10.3 percent) took the foundation-level papers, 35,113 (71.4 percent) took the ordinary-level papers, and 9,018 (18.3 percent) took the higher-level papers. Among higher-level candidates, 14.4 percent earned an A-grade and 82.5 percent received a C-grade or higher, while 14.5 percent received a D-grade and 3.2 percent failed. At ordinary level, 11.5 percent of candidates received an A-grade and 65.7 percent received a C-grade or higher, while 22.8 percent received a D-grade and 11.4 percent failed. At foundation level, 7.9 percent of candidates received an A-grade and 73.2 percent received a C-grade or higher, while 20.1 percent received a D-grade and 6.5 percent failed.
 In 2007, 49,043 candidates sat the exam, of whom 5,580 (11.3 percent) took the foundation-level papers, 35,075 (71.6 percent) took the ordinary-level papers, and 8,388 (17.1 percent) took the higher-level papers. At higher-level, 15.4 percent of candidates earned an A-grade and 80.1 percent received a C-grade or higher. Sixteen percent received a D-grade, while 3.9 percent failed. At ordinary level, 13.9 percent of candidates received an A-grade and 67.9 percent received a C-grade or higher, while 20.3 percent received a D-grade and 11.6 percent failed. At foundation level, 9.7 percent of candidates received an A-grade and 75.2 percent received a C-grade or higher, while 18.1 percent received a D-grade and 6.7 percent failed.
 In 2008, 50,116 candidates sat the exam, of whom 5,803 (11.6 percent) took the foundation-level papers, 35,803 (71.4 percent) took the ordinary-level papers, and 8,510 (17 percent) took the higher-level papers. At higher-level, 14.4 percent of candidates earned an A-grade, 82.3 percent received a C-grade or higher, 14.5 percent received a D-grade, while 3.2 percent failed. At ordinary level, 12.5 percent of candidates received an A-grade and 67.4 percent received a C-grade or higher, while 20.5 percent received a D-grade and 12.3 percent failed. At foundation level, 9.8 percent of candidates received an A-grade and 76.6 percent received a C-grade or higher, while 17.6 percent received a D-grade and 5.7 percent failed.

12,902 (26.3 percent) received between 25 and 40 points; 10,141 (20.7 percent) received between 45 and 60 points; 3,853 (7.8 percent) received between 65 and 80 points; and 2,129 (4.4 percent) received between 85 and 100 points.

In 2008, the participation rate in higher-level mathematics fell to 17.0 percent, while the failure rate at ordinary level increased to 12.3 percent.

Level of achievement
With the OECD's Programme for International Student Assessment ranking Irish teenagers 16th out of 30 member countries in mathematics ability, industry leaders have issued stern warnings about the future of Ireland's knowledge economy should mathematics continue to languish at secondary level.  With the backing of business and industry groups, former minister for education Mary Hanafin supported a proposal to give candidates bonus CAO points for higher-level maths, with the goal of encouraging more candidates to take the higher-level course. Hanafin's successor Batt O'Keeffe replaced that proposal with "Project Maths," an initiative that aims to improve standards in schools, and increase participation in the higher-level course to at least 30 percent, by making mathematics more user-friendly and more focused on practical applications. From 2012, a passing grade in higher level mathematics is awarded 25 bonus points. However, research has suggested that weaknesses in secondary-level mathematics can be traced to lack of support at the primary school level.

Third-level institutions such as NUI Galway, NUI Maynooth, and the Sligo Institute of Technology have now instituted internal examinations that give students who did not make the grade in Leaving Certificate mathematics another chance to gain entry to courses with prerequisites in the subject. At the Galway-Mayo Institute of Technology, students without the requisite grades in Leaving Certificate mathematics can gain entry to courses other than engineering, medical science, and nursing by completing an intensive three-week mathematics course over the summer.

References

Secondary education in Ireland
Secondary school qualifications